Volodymyr Romanenko (born 8 June 1985) is a professional Ukrainian football midfielder. He joined FC Banants in the summer transfer season of 2009 from FC Metalurh Donetsk.

In 2015–2016 Romanenko participated in the Crimean championship.

References 
 
 

1985 births
Living people
Sportspeople from Sumy
Ukrainian footballers banned from domestic competitions
Ukrainian footballers
FC Metalurh Donetsk players
FC Borysfen-2 Boryspil players
FC Dynamo-3 Kyiv players
FC Dnipro-2 Dnipropetrovsk players
FC Stal Kamianske players
FC Urartu players
FC Krymteplytsia Molodizhne players
PFC Sumy players
FC Helios Kharkiv players
FC Okean Kerch players
FC Viktoriya Mykolaivka players
Ukrainian Premier League players
Ukrainian expatriate footballers
Expatriate footballers in Armenia
Ukrainian expatriate sportspeople in Armenia
Armenian Premier League players
Crimean Premier League players
Association football midfielders